Bolbocara gyrinus is an extinct rattail that lived during the Upper Miocene subepoch of Southern California. It may be related to the extant genus Bathygadus.

See also

 Prehistoric fish
 List of prehistoric bony fish

References

Miocene fish of North America
Macrouridae